Namibia competed at the 2020 Summer Olympics in Tokyo. Originally scheduled to take place from 24 July to 9 August 2020, the Games were postponed to 23 July to 8 August 2021, because of the COVID-19 pandemic. It was the nation's eighth consecutive appearance at the Summer Olympics.

Medalists

Competitors
The following is the list of number of competitors in the Games.

Athletics

Namibian athletes achieved the entry standards, either by qualifying time or by world ranking, in the following track and field events (up to a maximum of 3 athletes in each event):

Track & road events

Boxing

Namibia entered one boxer into the Olympic tournament. Rio 2016 Olympian Jonas Junius scored an outright semifinal victory to secure a spot in the men's lightweight division at the 2020 African Qualification Tournament in Diamniadio, Senegal.

Cycling

Road
Namibia entered one rider (Dan Craven) to compete in the men's Olympic road race, by finishing in the top two, not yet qualified, at the 2019 African Championships in Addis Ababa, Ethiopia. He was replaced by Tristan de Lange after Craven tested positive for Covid-19. An additional spot was awarded to a Namibian cyclist in the women's road race by virtue of a top 100 individual finish in the UCI World Ranking.

Mountain biking
Namibia entered one rider each to compete in both men's and women's cross-country race, respectively, by virtue of their best individual ranking at the 2019 African Championships.

Rowing

Namibia qualified one boat in the women's single sculls for the Games by winning the gold medal and securing the first of five berths available at the 2019 FISA African Olympic Qualification Regatta in Tunis, Tunisia, marking the country's debut in the sport.

Qualification Legend: FA=Final A (medal); FB=Final B (non-medal); FC=Final C (non-medal); FD=Final D (non-medal); FE=Final E (non-medal); FF=Final F (non-medal); SA/B=Semifinals A/B; SC/D=Semifinals C/D; SE/F=Semifinals E/F; QF=Quarterfinals; R=Repechage

Swimming

Namibia entered one swimmer to compete at the Games for the first time since Sydney 2000. Phillip Seidler finished fourteenth in the men's 10 km open water to secure the remaining slot for Africa at the 2021 FINA Olympic Marathon Swim Qualifier in Setúbal, Portugal.

See also
Namibia at the 2020 Summer Paralympics

References

Nations at the 2020 Summer Olympics
2020
2021 in Namibian sport